Gift Fred (born 21 July 1998 in Masindi)  is a Ugandan footballer who plays for Uganda Premier League club SC Villa and the Uganda national team.

Club career
In August 2021, Gift signed a three-year contract with Uganda Premier League club SC Villa. Prior to signing for Villa, he played for the third division side of Booma FC.

International career
In December 2022, coach Milutin Sedrojevic invited him to be included in the Uganda national football team for the 2022 African Nations Championship which happens in Algeria. He made his debut in a friendly game between Uganda and Mali which ended in a 0–0 draw in Tunusia. He made his official senior debut in the  2022 African Nations Championship tournament when Uganda was drawing against Democratic Republic of Congo on 14 January 2023 at Annaba Stadium in Algeria.

International career statistics

References

External links

1998 births
Living people
Ugandan footballers
Uganda international footballers
Association football midfielders
SC Villa players